In rock climbing, redpointing means to free-climb a route from the ground to the top while lead climbing, after having previously practiced the route beforehand (either by hangdogging or top roping) or after having failed first attempt (i.e. falling or resting on the rope for artificial aid). Climbers will try to redpoint a route after having failed to onsight it (free climb the route on the first attempt with no falls and no prior information), or flash it (free climb the route on the first attempt with no falls but with prior information).  The first successful redpoint of a route, in the absence of any prior onsight or flash, is recorded as the first free ascent (FFA) of that route.

Description

Climbers can rest during a redpoint ascent, but not using the rope or any artificial aids (e.g. they can hang off the holds, or use a kneebar).  Where the climber falls during an attempted redpoint ascent (and are thus hanging off the rope), they must return to the very bottom of the climb, pull their rope free of the route, and completely re-start the ascent from scratch. This is also known as "climbing a route clean" (although it should not be confused with the broader topic of clean climbing). The first climber to complete a redpoint of a route, in the absence of any prior onsight or flash of a route, can claim to have made the first free ascent (FFA) of that route.

Where the quickdraws are pre-placed into the protection bolts (i.e. the climber is just clipping in the rope on their lead), it is called "pinkpointing"; in practice, most climbs on extreme sport routes are really pinkpoints, as are most climbs in modern climbing competitions, but the term "pinkpoint" is less frequently used.

Comparisons

The repeated practicing involved in redpointing compares to the largely traditional climbing action of "headpointing" (i.e. practicing the route on a toprope before making the first ascent) and "hangdoging" (i.e. resting on the rope while trying the moves), and since the 1980s, the term "redpoint" has become largely exclusive to sport climbing routes (i.e. with protection bolts pre-fixed into the rock at regular intervals).  While headpointing was once considered a lesser form of first free ascent in traditional climbing (and an FFA that had been headpointed would be asterisked as such), leading traditional climbers eventually followed the redpointing practices of the of sport climbers, and dispensed with the stigma associated with headpointing or hangdogging.  

Traditional climbers subsequently introduced the derived term "greenpointing" (or the Grünpunkt movement, as a play on the Rotpunkt movement), to describe climbing a pre-bolted sport-climb, but only using "traditional protection" (i.e. climbing protection that is not permanently fixed via pre-placed bolts or pitons); as with redpointing, the climber may have repeatedly practiced falling on the “traditional protection” before making their greenpoint ascent. Notable examples include Canadian Sonnie Trotter's greenpoint of The Path (5.14a R, 2007) in Lake Louise, Alberta, and of East Face (Monkey Face) (5.13d R, 2004) at Smith Rocks.

Projecting

Repeatedly attempting a redpoint can take place over any length of time, from hours to years (i.e. any time, once the initial onsight or flash has failed).  Climbers use the term projecting to denote a longer-term project to complete the FFA, or their own personal first ascent, of a route that is at the limit of their abilities.  The redpoint FFA of many of contemporary sport climbing routes, particularly those that involved breaking new grade milestones, took years, and even decades, to project (e.g. Realization, La Dura Dura, and Jumbo Love).  

While bouldering climbers use the terms onsight and flash, they mostly use the term projecting instead of redpointing, when discussing long-term attemepts of FFAs/personal first ascents.

Etymology

The English term "redpoint" is a loan translation of the German Rotpunkt that was coined by Kurt Albert in the mid-1970s at Frankenjura. Albert would paint a red "X" on any fixed metal pitons on a rock climbing route so that he could avoid using them while climbing, thus not using any artificial aid. Once Albert was able to free-climb the entire route, and avoid all the red "X"s, he would then paint a red "dot" (the "Roter Punkt") at the base of the route. Albert got the idea for the "red dot" from the logo and name of a brand of German coffee and kettle maker. To achieve a Rotpunkt, Albert additionally defined that if a climber fell during the ascent, they had to return to the base, pull the rope free, and re-start the climb from scratch (i.e. as if the climber had only just approached it).

The connotation spread of a "redpoint" being a route that had to be repeatedly attempted because it was so hard – which is why metal pitons had been hammered into the rock as an aid in the first place – until it could be climbed in one clean push (i.e. no falls, and any falls required a full re-start), and without any artificial aids.  Because these routes were already established aid climbing routes, Albert could not remove the pitons (that would happen in later decades), however, his Rotpunkt laid down a mark to other climbers that the route could be free climbed without the use of the metal aids, and thus became an important moment in the development of free climbing.  Eventually, Albert's Rotpunkts became associated with the development of sport climbing in the 1980s, as many of these aids were on routes that had no possibility of even natural traditional climbing protection (e.g. no cracks), and thus bolts would be needed for protection (but not aid).

Notable redpoints

Notable redpointed climbs are chronicled by the climbing media to track progress in rock climbing standards and levels of technical difficulty; in contrast, the hardest traditional climbing routes tend to be of lower technical difficulty due to the additional burden of having to place protection during the course of the climb, and due to the lack of any possibility of using natural protection on extreme sport climbs.  

See also
History of rock climbing

References

External links
Watch Alex Megos Red Point Film Rotpunkt, a 2020 film by Alex Megos on the history of the "Rotpunkt" (Gripped Magazine, February 2020).

Types of climbing
Climbing techniques